Brady v. Daly, 175 U.S. 148 (1899), was a United States Supreme Court case in which the Court held the common law circuit court did have jurisdiction over the copyright infringement case because the statutory damages were not a penalty or forfeiture.

This case is related to Webster v. Daly. They arose from the same set of copyright infringement disputes regarding Under the Gaslight by Augustin Daly.

The United States abolished the circuit court system involved in Webster v. Daly in 1912. The modern analog would be the district courts.

References

External links
 
 

1899 in United States case law
United States Supreme Court cases
United States Supreme Court cases of the Fuller Court
United States copyright case law